Cerro Las Piñas (Spanish for "pineapples hill") is a mountain of the Sierra de Cayey located in the boundary between the municipalities of Caguas and Cayey in central Puerto Rico. The summit is located at 2,425 feet (739 m) above sea level, in the barrios Beatriz of Caguas, and Beatriz and Guavate of Cayey. The summit offers panoramic views of the Valley of Caguas and Cayey.

Gallery

References 

Mountains of Puerto Rico
Caguas, Puerto Rico
Cayey, Puerto Rico